Live Islington Assembly Hall is KT Tunstall's fifth live album, recorded on 20 June 2013. It features some tracks from her previous albums, but mostly, new tracks from her 2013 release Invisible Empire // Crescent Moon, and a cover of Don Henley's "The Boys of Summer". Tunstall interacts with the audience, having conversations and making jokes, making the gig feel intimate and personal.

Release 
The album was recorded on 20 June 2013 by instant delivery company Abbey Road Studios Live Here Now. Fans were able to purchase the CD at the show and pick it up directly after the show finished. The CD was available through KT Tunstall's online store, the Abbey Road Live Here Now online store and at her live shows.

Track listing

References 

2013 live albums
KT Tunstall albums
EMI Records live albums